Miguel Estrada (born 16 June 1950) is a Spanish basketball player. He competed in the men's tournament at the 1972 Summer Olympics.

References

External links
 

1950 births
Living people
Spanish men's basketball players
1974 FIBA World Championship players
Olympic basketball players of Spain
Basketball players at the 1972 Summer Olympics
Basketball players from Madrid